Erin Elizabeth Smith is an American poet, editor, publisher, and educator.

Biography
Smith, originally from Lexington, South Carolina, holds a B.A. in English from Binghamton University, an M.F.A. in Poetry from the University of Illinois, and a Ph.D. in Literature and Creative Writing from the University of Southern Mississippi. She currently teaches creative writing and literature at the University of Tennessee. She is the author of three full-length poetry collections as well as a chapbook. Smith lives in Oak Ridge, Tennessee, where serves as the Executive Director of the Sundress Academy for the Arts, a writers residency and arts collective.

In 1999, Smith founded Stirring: A Literary Collection, now one of the oldest continually-published literary journals on the internet. A year later, she founded Sundress Publications, a literary organization that publishes several online journals as well as chapbooks and full-length poetry collections in both print and electronic formats. In 2006, Smith founded the Best of the Net Anthology, also published by Sundress.

Bibliography

Poetry collections
 
 
 DOWN, Stephen F. Austin State University Press. 2020.

Chapbook

Reviews
 The Naming of Strays reviewed by Anne Barngrover 
 The Naming of Strays reviewed by Karen J. Weyant 
 The Fear of Being Found reviewed by Gary Charles Wilkens 
 The Fear of Being Found reviewed by Wendy Whelan

References

Living people
University of Tennessee faculty
American women poets
People from Lexington, South Carolina
Year of birth missing (living people)
American women academics
21st-century American women